Penelope Moreton (born 23 March 1932) is an Irish equestrian. She competed in two events at the 1968 Summer Olympics.

References

1932 births
Living people
Irish female equestrians
Olympic equestrians of Ireland
Equestrians at the 1968 Summer Olympics
Sportspeople from Kent
20th-century Irish women